, born Minoru Watabe, was a Japanese enka singer. He has been dubbed "the first enka singer".

Having seen Ichiro Fujiyama on stage, he attempted to become a popular singer. After he graduated from the Toyo Music School, he joined the Imperial Japanese Army in 1944, and returned from Taiwan in 1945. He joined Shinjuku Moulin Rouge in 1947 and then King Records in 1949.

In 1952, Kasuga made his debut with the song , which at first got into the news in Nagoya. His popularity soon became widespread. His 1954 song  became more successful throughout Japan. This single sold 500,000 copies in a half year, and eventually sold more than one million copies.

In 1955, he also released the single  which he musically sought. The song was composed by Toru Funamura. His music, which was later called enka, had much effect on subsequent popular music of Japan.

References

External links 
 
 Memorial Park for Hachiro Kasuga  

1924 births
1991 deaths
Enka singers
Japanese racehorse owners and breeders
Musicians from Fukushima Prefecture
20th-century Japanese male singers
20th-century Japanese singers
Imperial Japanese Army personnel of World War II